The Launching of Modern American Science, 1846–1876 is a 1987 nonfiction book by American historian Robert V. Bruce, published by Knopf. The book is a social history chronicling a three-decade period in American science. It won the 1988 Pulitzer Prize for History.

References 

1987 non-fiction books
Pulitzer Prize for History-winning works
History books about the United States
Books about the history of science
Alfred A. Knopf books